Swan Creek may refer to:

Australia 

 Swan Creek, Queensland, a locality in the Southern Downs Region

United States 
 Swan Creek (Indian River tributary), a tributary to Indian River in Sussex County, Delaware
 Swan Creek (Maryland), a tributary of the Susquehanna River
 Swan Creek, North Carolina
 Swan Creek AVA, American viticultural area in North Carolina
 Swan Creek (St. Joseph River) a stream in Saginaw County, Michigan
 Swan Creek Township, Saginaw County, Michigan
 Swan Creek (Gasconade River), a stream in Missouri
 Swan Creek (White River), a stream in southern Missouri
 Swan Creek Township, Fulton County, Ohio
 Swan Creek Preserve Metropark, Toledo, Ohio

See also
 Big Swan Creek